Sara Gibbs is a British comedy script writer and autism advocate with credits on the British television shows HIGNFY, Dead Ringers, The News Quiz, The Now Show and The Mash Report amongst others.

She grew up in East Grinstead, England in a culturally Jewish (which sustained her socially) New Age family who made occasional shul visits, and was given a Waldorf education. She is a graduate of the National Film and Television School's Writing & Producing Comedy course.

She was diagnosed with autism spectrum at thirty. She regards her diagnosis "like returning to my own planet" and explanatory of much of her lifelong behaviour and idiocyncracies. Her 2021 memoir Drama Queen: One Autistic Woman and a Life of Unhelpful labels was well received.

Personal life 
Gibbs lives with her husband in southeast England, and identifies as bisexual.

References

External links 

21st-century English memoirists
21st-century English women writers
21st-century English Jews
English comedy writers
Jewish comedy writers
British women memoirists
English Jewish writers
Jewish women writers
People from East Grinstead
People on the autism spectrum
Writers with disabilities
English people with disabilities
Living people
Year of birth missing (living people)